Rohuküla is a village in Ridala Parish, Lääne County, in western Estonia. It is a seaport connecting the mainland with the islands of Hiiumaa (Heltermaa port) and Vormsi (Sviby port). During winter there are two ice roads from the village to the two islands, the one to Hiiumaa being Europe's longest, at 26.5 km.

Rohuküla is the birthplace of artist Enno Hallek.

References

Villages in Lääne County